Fukuoka is a Japanese surname. Notable people with the surname include:

 Haruna Fukuoka (born 1984), Japanese table tennis player
, Japanese tennis player
, Japanese rugby union player
, Japanese judoka
 Masanobu Fukuoka (1913-2008), author of The One Straw Revolution,  pioneer of no-till farming
 Tomio Fukuoka (born 1936 -) Japanese educator
, Japanese footballer
 Fukuoka Takachika (1835-1919), Japanese statesman of the Meiji period

Japanese-language surnames